In mathematical physics, covariant classical field theory represents classical fields by sections of fiber bundles, and their dynamics is phrased in the context of a finite-dimensional space of fields. Nowadays, it is well known that jet bundles and the variational bicomplex are the correct domain for such a description. The Hamiltonian variant of covariant classical field theory is the covariant Hamiltonian field theory where momenta correspond to derivatives of field variables with respect to all world coordinates. Non-autonomous mechanics is formulated as covariant classical field theory on fiber bundles over the time axis ℝ.

Examples 
Many important examples of classical field theories which are of interest in quantum field theory are given below. In particular, these are the theories which make up the Standard model of particle physics. These examples will be used in the discussion of the general mathematical formulation of classical field theory.

Uncoupled theories 
 Scalar field theory
 Klein−Gordon theory
 Spinor theories
 Dirac theory
 Weyl theory
 Majorana theory
 Gauge theories
 Maxwell theory
 Yang–Mills theory. This is the only theory in the uncoupled theory list which contains interactions: Yang–Mills contains self-interactions.

Coupled theories 
 Yukawa coupling: coupling of scalar and spinor fields.
 Scalar electrodynamics/chromodynamics: coupling of scalar and gauge fields.
 Quantum electrodynamics/chromodynamics: coupling of spinor and gauge fields. Despite these being named quantum theories, the Lagrangians can be considered as those of a classical field theory.

Requisite mathematical structures 
In order to formulate a classical field theory, the following structures are needed:

Spacetime 
A smooth manifold . 

This is variously known as the world manifold (for emphasizing the manifold without additional structures such as a metric), spacetime (when equipped with a Lorentzian metric), or the base manifold for a more geometrical viewpoint.

Structures on spacetime 
The spacetime often comes with additional structure. Examples are
 Metric up to conformal equivalence
as well as the required structure of an orientation, needed for a notion of integration over all of the manifold .

Symmetries of spacetime 
The spacetime  may admit symmetries. The symmetries form a group , the automorphisms of spacetime.

For example, for Minkowski space, the symmetries are the Poincaré group .

Gauge, principal bundles and connections 
A Lie group  describing the (continuous) symmetries of internal degrees of freedom. The corresponding Lie algebra through the Lie group–Lie algebra correspondence is denoted . This is referred to as the gauge group.

A principal -bundle , otherwise known as a -torsor. This is sometimes written as 

Connections and gauge fields 
Here we take the view of the connection as a principal connection. In field theory this connection is also viewed as a covariant derivative  whose action on various fields is defined later. 

A principal connection denoted  is a -valued 1-form on P satisfying technical conditions of 'projection' and 'right-equivariance': details found in the principal connection article.

Under a trivialization this can be written as a local gauge field , a -valued 1-form on a trivialization patch . It is this local form of the connection which is identified with gauge fields in physics. When the base manifold  is flat, there are simplifications which remove this subtlety.

Associated vector bundles and matter content 
An associated vector bundle  associated to the principal bundle  through a representation  

A field or matter field is a section of an associated vector bundle. The collection of these, together with gauge fields, is the matter content of the theory.

Lagrangian 
A Lagrangian : given a fiber bundle , the Lagrangian is a function .

This then allows  to be viewed as a functional of a field.

This completes the mathematical prerequisites for a large number of interesting theories, including those given in the examples section above.

Theories on flat spacetime 

When the base manifold  is flat, that is, (Pseudo-)Euclidean space, there are many useful simplifications that make theories less conceptually difficult to deal with. 

The simplifications come from the observation that flat spacetime is contractible: it is then a theorem in algebraic topology that any fibre bundle over flat  is trivial.

In other words, vector bundles at different points are comparable. In addition, for flat spacetime the Levi-Civita connection is the trivial connection on the frame bundle.

Then the spacetime covariant derivative on tensor or spin-tensor fields is simply the partial derivative in flat coordinates. However the gauge covariant derivative may require a non-trivial connection  which is considered to be the gauge field of the theory.

Accuracy as a physical model 

In weak gravitational curvature, flat spacetime often serves as a good approximation to weakly curved spacetime. For experiment, this approximation is good. The Standard Model is defined on flat spacetime, and has produced the most accurate precision tests of physics to date.

See also
Classical field theory
Exterior algebra
Lagrangian system
Variational bicomplex
Quantum field theory
Non-autonomous mechanics
Higgs field (classical)

References
 Saunders, D.J., "The Geometry of Jet Bundles", Cambridge University Press, 1989, 
 Bocharov, A.V. [et al.] "Symmetries and conservation laws for differential equations of mathematical physics", Amer. Math. Soc., Providence, RI, 1999,   
 De Leon, M., Rodrigues, P.R., "Generalized Classical Mechanics and Field Theory", Elsevier Science Publishing, 1985, 
 Griffiths, P.A., "Exterior Differential Systems and the Calculus of Variations", Boston: Birkhäuser, 1983, 
 Gotay, M.J., Isenberg, J., Marsden, J.E., Montgomery R., Momentum Maps and Classical Fields Part I: Covariant Field Theory, November 2003 
 Echeverria-Enriquez, A., Munoz-Lecanda, M.C., Roman-Roy, M., Geometry of Lagrangian First-order Classical Field Theories, May 1995 
 Giachetta, G., Mangiarotti, L., Sardanashvily, G., "Advanced Classical Field Theory", World Scientific, 2009,  

Differential topology
Differential equations
Fiber bundles
Theoretical physics
Lagrangian mechanics